Leigh S. J. Hunt (August 1855 – October 5, 1933) was an American businessman. He is best known as the third president of Iowa State University (1885-1886), and as publisher of the Seattle Post-Intelligencer from 1886 to 1893. The community of Hunts Point, Washington bears his name.

Biography

Early life and education
Leigh Smith James Hunt was born on a farm near Columbia City, Indiana, in August 1855. His parents, Franklin and Martha (Long) Hunt, were natives of the same State. Hunt earned an undergraduate degree from Middlebury College via correspondence course and studied law on his own before passing the Indiana bar exam.

Career
After completing his education in 1879 he went to Cedar Falls, Iowa, and engaged in teaching school, subsequently becoming Principal. There he established his reputation as an educator, and some time later he was engaged as Superintendent of the Schools at Mount Pleasant, Iowa (1880) and Des Moines, Iowa (1882) and still later as President of the State Agricultural College at Ames, Iowa (now the Iowa State University).

In 1886, he went to Seattle and purchased the Seattle Post-Intelligencer, which he owned and published until 1893. His later career included real estate development, operating a gold mine in Korea, growing cotton in Sudan (1904-1910), and mining and land development in Las Vegas, Nevada. The Huntridge neighborhood in Las Vegas was developed on land that was his farm.

Marriage and children
Hunt and his wife Jessie Noble Hunt (c. 1862–1960) were married in 1885 and had two children:
Henry Leigh Hunt (1886-1972), 1st husband (1925-1930s) of Louise Lévêque de Vilmorin (1902-1969), French novelist and seed heiress.  They had three daughters: Jessie, Alexandra, and Helena. 
Helen Hunt Rives (1893-1996)

References 
An Illustrated History of the State of Washington, by Rev. Harvey K. Hines, D.D., The Lewis Publishing Co., Chicago, IL., 1893, pages 346 
Far Outliers: Leigh S. J. Hunt (1854-1933), Adventuresome Capitalist
 Iowa State University Third President Leigh S. J. Hunt
Leigh S.J. Hunt papers - Special Collections, UWashingtonLibraries

1855 births
1933 deaths
19th-century American newspaper publishers (people)
People from Columbia City, Indiana
Presidents of Iowa State University
People from Cedar Falls, Iowa
Seattle Post-Intelligencer people
School superintendents in Iowa